"You Can't Stop Love" is a song co-written and recorded by American country music artist Marty Stuart.  It was released in October 1996 as the third single from the album Honky Tonkin's What I Do Best.  The song reached #26 on the Billboard Hot Country Singles & Tracks chart.  The song was written by Stuart and Kostas.

Chart performance

References

1996 singles
1996 songs
Songs written by Kostas (songwriter)
Songs written by Marty Stuart
Song recordings produced by Tony Brown (record producer)
MCA Records singles